The Gibraltar Apprentices and Ex-Apprentices Union was a trade union in the United Kingdom. It merged with the Transport and General Workers' Union in 1963.

See also
 List of trade unions
 Transport and General Workers' Union
 TGWU amalgamations

References
Arthur Ivor Marsh, Victoria Ryan. Historical Directory of Trade Unions, Volume 5 Ashgate Publishing, Ltd., Jan 1, 2006 pg. 436

Defunct trade unions of the United Kingdom
Trade unions in Gibraltar
Transport and General Workers' Union amalgamations
Trade unions disestablished in 1963